Guanyang County is a county in the northeast of the Guangxi Zhuang Autonomous Region, China, bordering Hunan province to the east. It is under the administration of Guilin city.

Yao people
Yao ethnic subgroups and dialect areas of Guanyang County are:
Pan Yao 盘瑶
Iu Mien 优勉, Guoshan Yao 过山瑶
Dahejiang 大河江, Yezhudian 野猪殿, and Baoliang 保良 of Dongjing 洞井
Xiaohejiang 小河江 of Dongjing 洞井, Panjiang 盘江 of Guanyin'ge 观音阁
Doushui 陡水, Dazhushan 大竹山, and Shunxi 顺溪 of Huanguan 黄关
Biao Min
Dialect area 1
Hongqi Township 红旗乡: Wenhua 文化, Xiufeng 秀凤, Shangwang 上王, Helong 鹤龙
Xinyu Township 新圩乡: Hongshuiqing 洪水箐, Guiyang 贵阳
Shuiche Township 水车乡: Shangpao 上泡, Xiapao 下泡, Dongliu 东流, Hecheng 合成, Sanhuang 三皇, Xiumu 修睦
Dialect area 2
Jiangtang, Shuiche 水车乡江塘; Baizhuping, Wenshi 文市镇白竹坪
White-Collar / Bailing Yao 白领瑶. The Bailing Yao speak a form of Pinghua called Youjia(hua) 优家话.
Xishan Township 西山瑶族乡: Lannitang 烂泥塘, Yantang 盐塘, Lingdi 灵地, Hongtou 江头, Huangnibang 黄泥榜, Jiangkou 江口, Beishajian 北沙涧, Chayuan 茶源
Xinjie Township 新街乡: Liexijian 烈溪涧
Hongqi Township 红旗乡: Dayuan 大源, Fanshen 翻身, Matou 马头, Yutang 鱼塘, Paibujiang 排埠江
Xinwei Township 新圩乡: Chaoli 潮立
Four-Village / Sicun Yao 四村瑶. The Sicun Yao speak a form of Pinghua called Sicun(hua) 四村话. It is related to Youjia(hua) 优家话, which is spoken by the neighboring Bailing Yao 白领瑶.
Dongjiang Township 洞井瑶族乡: Baoliang 保良
Jiaojiang Yao 蕉江瑶. The Jiaojiang Yao speak a form of Pinghua of the same name (Jiaojiang Yao 蕉江瑶语).
Xishan Township 西山瑶族乡: Daping 大坪, Batang 扒塘, Jiangkou 江口, Henglutou 横路头, Zhendongjiang 正东江
Hongqi Township 红旗乡: Fanshen 翻身, Matou 马头, Dayuan 大源, Yutang 鱼塘

Climate

References

Counties of Guangxi
Administrative divisions of Guilin